Nika may refer to:

Surname
 Ansi Nika (born 1990), Albanian footballer
 Lelo Nika (born 1969), Serbian and Romanian Romani accordionist
 Rakitina Nika, pen name of science fiction and fantasy writer Ludmila Bogdanova (born 1963)

Other uses
 Nika (film), a Russian biographical drama film
 Nika (given name)
 Nika Shakarami, Iranian woman killed in Mahsa Amini protests 
 Nike (mythology), or Nika, the goddess of victory
 Nika Award, a Russian film award
 Nika District, Paktika Province, Afghanistan
 NIKA Racing, a Swedish car racing team
 AS Nika, a football club in Kisangani, Democratic Republic of Congo
 Neka, also known as Nīkā, a city in Mazandaran Province, Iran

See also
 Nika riots, riots that took place over the course of a week in Constantinople in 532
 Nikka (disambiguation)
 Nikas (disambiguation)